The 2003 Nigerian Senate election in Federal Capital Territory was held on April 12, 2003, to elect member of the Nigerian Senate to represent Federal Capital Territory. Isah Maina representing FCT Senatorial District won on the platform of the Peoples Democratic Party.

Overview

Summary

Results

FCT Senatorial District 
The election was won by Isah Maina of the Peoples Democratic Party.

References 

April 2003 events in Nigeria
Federal Capital Territory Senate elections
Fed